Fernando Ubiergo (born February 8, 1953) is a Chilean singer-songwriter and musician.

Ubiergo is renowned for his creative musical work that has developed over a career spanning more than thirty years, which include awards from the Festival International de la Canción de Viña del Mar (the Viña del Mar International Song Festival), Festival de Benidorm (Benidorm International Song Festival) and Festival de la OTI (OTI Festival) among other achievements. Critics have constantly praised his songwriting for its depth and simplicity. He has won the admiration of several generations of Chilean and Latin Americans alike for the style of his musical narrative.

References

↑ Inolvidables Canal 13
 Ubiergo quiere distribuir sus discos para revertir bajas ventas de última placa, Cooperativa, 10 de mayo de 2004.
 Fernando Ubiergo, La sombra del águila, Emol.com
 Fernando Ubiergo declaró sobre el plagio: "Es un robo a mano armada", Cooperativa, 4 de enero de 2007
 Un caso de plagio actual, Atina Chile, 7 de enero de 2007
 Mago de Oz dice haber plagiado “por error” a un artista chileno y pide disculpas, El Confidencial Musical, 22 de enero de 2007
 Ubiergo y el plagio de Mago de Oz: "No puedo permitirlo", Emol, 4 de enero de 2007
 Presidente de la sociedad chilena de autores dimite por usar software ilegal", Terra Actualidad, 8 de enero de 2009

1953 births
20th-century Chilean male singers
Chilean singer-songwriters
Musicians from Valparaíso
Singers from Valparaíso
Living people
Chile in the OTI Festival
20th-century Chilean male artists